{{DISPLAYTITLE:C16H13Cl2NO4}}
The molecular formula C16H13Cl2NO4 (molar mass: 354.185 g/mol, exact mass: 353.0222 u) may refer to:

 Aceclofenac
 Quinfamide

Molecular formulas